Kenneth McIntosh (born March 3, 2000) is an American football running back for the Georgia Bulldogs.

Early life and high school 
McIntosh grew up in Fort Lauderdale, Florida, and attended University School in nearby Davie.  His older brothers are collegiate running back Deon McIntosh—who played at Notre Dame and Washington State—and NFL defensive end R. J. McIntosh.

College career 
McIntosh saw limited playing time as a freshman during Georgia's 2019 season, garnering 174 yards and 2 touchdowns on 25 carries while playing behind fellow running backs D'Andre Swift, Brian Herrien, Zamir White, and James Cook.  As a sophomore in the shortened 2020 season, McIntosh rushed for 251 yards (third most behind White and Cook) and 1 touchdown on 47 carries (second most behind White).  In 13 games as a junior in 2021 (including the SEC Championship and Georgia's two playoff games), McIntosh ran for 328 yards and 3 touchdowns on 58 carries (third most behind White and Cook), adding another 242 yards receiving and 2 touchdown catches.

On December 31, 2021, in the first quarter of the Orange Bowl against Michigan (first round of the CFP), Georgia ran a trick play in which McIntosh took a handoff from quarterback Stetson Bennett, rolled to the right, and completed an 18-yard touchdown pass to receiver Adonai Mitchell, putting Georgia up 14–0. The Bulldogs later won 34-11 and advanced to the 2022 College Football Playoff National Championship. In the national championship, McIntosh rushed 2 times for 6 yards and caught 3 passes for 23 yards in the 33-18 win over Alabama.

Statistics

References

Living people
American football running backs
Georgia Bulldogs football players
NSU University School alumni
2000 births